This is a timeline documenting the events of heavy metal in the year 1982.

Newly formed bands

Abattoir 
Arakain 
Armored Saint
 Artillery
Avenger 
Baby Tuckoo 
BlackLace  
Brocas Helm 
Cinderella  
Cobra
Coney Hatch
 Corrosion of Conformity (not originally a metal band)
Crumbsuckers
Culprit 
 Death Angel
 Destruction
 Dio
 Dirty Rotten Imbeciles
Dr. Mastermind
D.A.D.
Ezo
Fates Warning
The Georgia Satellites
 Godflesh (under the name "Fall of Because" until 1988)
Guardian 
Hazzard
Heavens Gate  
Hell 
Hellhammer
Hellion 
Helstar 
Kreator
Lȧȧz Rockit
Lethal 
Liege Lord
Luzbel
Mad Max 
Madam X  
Mournblade
No Mercy 
Obsession 
Onslaught 
Outrage  
Philadelphia  
Post Mortem   
Roxx Gang
Seikima-II  
Sieges Even
Sinner 
Smack
Streets
Tankard 
Terra Rosa 
TNT 
Tredegar 
Tublatanka 
 Steve Vai
Voivod
W.A.S.P.
Warlock 
Warrior  
Warriors
Watchtower
Waysted
Wrath 
X (later known as X Japan)
Znowhite

Albums & EPs

 Lee Aaron - The Lee Aaron Project
 Accept - Restless and Wild
 Acid - Acid
 Aerosmith - Rock in a Hard Place
 Alice Cooper - Zipper Catches Skin
 Americade - American Metal
 Anvil - Metal on Metal
 April Wine - Power Play
 August Redmoon - Fools Are Never Alone (EP)
 Axewitch - Pray for Metal (EP)
 The B'zz – Get Up
 Barón Rojo - Volumen brutal
 Beast (Ger) - Beast
 Bengal Tigers - Metal Fetish (EP)
 Bitch - Damnation Alley (EP)
 Bitches Sin - Predator
 Blackfoot - Highway Song Live! 
 Black Sabbath - Live Evil 
 Blue Öyster Cult - Extraterrestrial Live 
 Bodine - Bold as Brass
 Bow Wow – Asian Volcano
 Bow Wow – Warning From Stardust
 Budgie - Deliver Us from Evil
 Breaker (Can) - In Days of Heavy Metal (EP)
 Breslau - Volksmusik
 Cheap Trick - One on One
 Cintron - Cintron (EP)
 Cloven Hoof - The Opening Ritual (EP)
 Coney Hatch - Coney Hatch
 Demon - The Unexpected Guest 
 Demon Flight - Demon Flight (EP)
 Diamond Head  -  Borrowed Time
 Dietrich - Dietrich (EP)
 E.F. Band - Deep Cut
 Fargo - F
 Fist (UK) - Back with a Vengeance
 Fortnox - Fortnox
 Gamma - Gamma 3
 Gary Moore - Corridors of Power
 Gaskin - No Way Out
 Geddes Axe - Escape from New York (EP)
 Gillan - Magic
 Girl - Wasted Youth
 Girlschool - Screaming Blue Murder
 Glory Bells Band - Dressed in Black
 Grand Prix – There for None to See
 Sammy Hagar - Three Lock Box
 Hanoi Rocks - Oriental Beat
 Hanoi Rocks - Self Destruction Blues
 Headpins - Turn It Loud
 Heavy Load - Death or Glory
 Heritage - Remorse Code
 Hughes/Thrall - Hughes/Thrall
 The Hunt - The Thrill of the Kill
 Hyksos - Hyksos
 Iron Maiden - The Number of the Beast
 Judas Priest - Screaming for Vengeance
 Killer (Bel) - Wall of Sound
 Killer (Swi) - Thriller
 Kiss  -  Creatures of the Night
 Krokus - One Vice at a Time
 Led Zeppelin - Coda (comp)
 Legend - Death in the Nursery
 Legend - Frontline (EP)
 Loudness - Devil Soldier
 Mad Max - Mad Max
 Magnum - Chase the Dragon
 Mama's Boys - Plug It In
 Manilla Road - Metal
 Manowar - Battle Hymns
 Frank Marino - Juggernaut
 Mercy – Swedish Metal (EP)
 Mercyful Fate - Nuns Have No Fun (EP)
 Messendger - Messendger
 Metal Massacre - Metal Massacre (Compilation, various artists)
 Metal Massacre - Metal Massacre II (Compilation, various artists)
 Michael Schenker Group - Assault Attack
 More - Blood & Thunder
 Motörhead - Iron Fist
 Night Ranger - Dawn Patrol
 Nightwing – Black Summer 
 No Bros - Ready for the Action
 Aldo Nova - Aldo Nova
 Ted Nugent - Nugent
 Obús - Poderoso como el trueno
 Ozzy Osbourne - Speak of the Devil (live)
 Overlord (US) - Broken Toys (EP)
 Pat Benatar - Get Nervous
 Picture - Diamond Dreamer
 Plasmatics - Coup d'Etat
 Rage (UK) - Nice 'n' Dirty
 Rainbow - Straight Between the Eyes
 Rapid Tears - Honestly
 Raven - Crash Bang Wallop (EP)
 Raven - Wiped Out
 Resurrection Band - D.M.Z.
 Riff Raff - Robot Stud
 Riot - Restless Breed
 Riot - Riot Live (EP)
 The Rods - Wild Dogs
 Rose Tattoo - Scarred for Life
 Rush - Signals
 Samson - Losing My Grip (EP) 
 Samson  -  Before the Storm
 Santers - Mayday (EP)
 Santers - Racing Time
 Saxon - The Eagle Has Landed (live)
 Scorpions - Blackout
 Sharks - Altar Ego
 Shiva - Firedance
 Sinner - Wild 'n' Evil
 Speed Queen - Speed Queen, aka II
 Split Beaver - When Hell Won't Have You
 Squadron - First Mission
 Stampede - Days of Wine and Roses (EP)
 Stampede - The Official Bootleg (live)
 Street Fighter - Feel the Noise
 Stress - Stress
 Sweet - Identity Crisis
 Talas - Sink Your Teeth Into That
 Tank - Filth Hounds of Hades
 Tank - Power of the Hunter
 Teeze (CA) - Teeze (EP)
 38 Special - Special Forces
 TNT - TNT
 Torch - Fire Raiser (EP)
 Bernie Tormé  – Turn Out the Lights
 Trance - Break Out
 Trust - Savage
 Twisted Sister - Ruff Cuts (EP)
 Twisted Sister - Under the Blade
 Tygers of Pan Tang - The Cage
 Tytan - Blind Men and Fools (EP)
 UFO - Mechanix
 Uriah Heep - Abominog
 Vanadium - Metal Rock
 Vandenberg - Vandenberg
 Van Halen - Diver Down
 Vardis - Quo Vardis
 Vendetta (US) - Vendetta
 Venom - Black Metal
 Virgin Steele - Virgin Steele
 Viva – Dealers of the Night
 Voie De Fait - Ange ou Démon
 Voltz - Knight's Fall
 Warning - Warning II
 White Heat – White Heat
 Whitesnake - Saints & Sinners
 Witchfinder General  – Soviet Invasion (EP)
 Witchfinder General - Death Penalty Y&T - Black Tiger Zero Nine – Blank Verse Zero Nine – Visions, Scenes and DreamsEvents
 Iron Maiden's first album with Bruce Dickinson, The Number of the Beast, reaches No.1 in the U.K. music charts.
 Motörhead's guitarist "Fast" Eddie Clarke leaves the band and is replaced by ex-Thin Lizzy guitarist Brian Robertson.
 Judas Priest's single "You've Got Another Thing Comin'" is released. It will go on to become the band's best selling single.
 Ozzy Osbourne's guitarist Randy Rhoads dies in an airplane accident on March 19.
 Iron Maiden's drummer Clive Burr is fired from the band because of personal and tour-schedule problems. Nicko McBrain from Trust is hired to replace him.
 Ace Frehley, Space Ace and lead guitarist of Kiss, leaves the band. Vinnie Vincent takes his place. 
 Queen departs from their hard rock legacy with the ill-received funk/disco album Hot Space''.
 December: Former Deep Purple vocalist Ian Gillan replaces Ronnie James Dio in Black Sabbath.
 The band Metallica leaves Los Angeles and relocates to the San Francisco Bay Area.

1980s in heavy metal music
Metal